Viaje de una noche de verano is a 1965 Argentine film.

Cast
  Tato Bores
  Claudia Mores
  Enrique Dumas
  Roberto Escalada
  Néstor Fabián
  Olga Frances
  Ranko Fujisawa
  Ramona Galarza
  Iko Avo
  Juan Ramón
  Los Arribeños
  Los Wonderful's
  Los Wawancó
  Diana Maggi
  Luis Medina Castro
  Chico Novarro
  Alberto Olmedo
  María Esther Podestá
  Atahualpa Yupanqui
  Emilio Buis
  Luis Sandrini
  Marcos Zucker
  Dorita Acosta
  Alfredo Barbieri
  Blackie
  Elsa Daniel
  Ángel Magaña
  Don Pelele
  Fidel Pintos
  Juan Manuel Fangio
  Sergio Corona

External links
 

1965 films
1960s Spanish-language films
Argentine black-and-white films
Films directed by Carlos Rinaldi
Argentine comedy films
Films directed by Fernando Ayala
Films directed by Rubén W. Cavallotti
Films directed by Rodolfo Kuhn
Films directed by José A. Martínez Suárez
Films directed by René Múgica
1960s Argentine films